Marlena may refer to:

 Marlena Jansson (born 1970), Swedish orienteer
 Marlena Shaw (born 1942), American singer

Characters 
 Marlena Evans, a character on the soap opera Days of our Lives
 Queen Marlena, the mother of He-Man and She-Ra
 Marlena, a World Wrestling Federation character portrayed by Terri Runnels
 Marlena Gru, the mother of Gru from Despicable Me
 Marlena Cesaire, the mother of Alya Cesaire from Miraculous: Tales of Ladybug & Cat Noir

Music 
 Marlena (song), a song recorded and released by the Four Seasons c. 1963
 Marlena (Die Flippers album), 1977
 Marlena (Marlena Shaw album), 1972

See also
 Marlene (disambiguation)